Keisaku Itokazu (糸数 敬作, born November 7, 1984) is a Japanese former professional baseball pitcher in Japan's Nippon Professional Baseball. He played for the Hokkaido Nippon-Ham Fighters from 2009 to 2012.

External links

NBP

1984 births
Living people
Baseball people from Okinawa Prefecture
Nippon Professional Baseball pitchers
Hokkaido Nippon-Ham Fighters players
Japanese expatriate baseball players in the United States
West Oahu Canefires players